Traditionally, the bird order Apodiformes  contained three living families: the swifts (Apodidae), the treeswifts (Hemiprocnidae), and the  hummingbirds (Trochilidae).  In the Sibley-Ahlquist taxonomy, this order is raised to a superorder Apodimorphae in which hummingbirds are separated as a new order, Trochiliformes. With nearly 450 species identified to date, they are the most diverse order of birds after the passerines.

Description
As their name ("footless" in Greek) suggests, their legs are small and have limited function aside from perching.  The feet are covered with bare skin rather than the scales (scutes) that other birds have.  Another shared characteristic is long wings with short, stout humerus bones.  The evolution of these wing characteristics has provided the hummingbird with ideal wings for hovering.

The hummingbirds, swifts, and crested swifts share other anatomical similarities with one another, as well as similarities (notably as to the skull) with their probable closest living relatives, the owlet-nightjars. The owlet-nightjars are apparently convergent with the closely related Caprimulgiformes, which form a clade Cypselomorphae with the Apodiformes.

Evolution
The Apodiformes evolved in the Northern Hemisphere. Eocypselus, a primitive genus known from the Late Paleocene or Early Eocene of north-central Europe, is somewhat difficult to assign; it is considered a primitive hemiprocnid.  This would suggest that the major apodiform lineages diverged shortly after the Cretaceous–Paleogene boundary. However, the perching adaptation of the foot of Eocypselus on which this theory rests may just as well be a symplesiomorphy.
Most researchers believe that presently this genus cannot be unequivocally assigned to either the Apodiformes or the Caprimulgiformes. 

The Early Eocene Primapus, found in England, is similar to both a primitive swift and the aegialornithids, which are in some aspects intermediate between swifts and owlet-nightjars. Fossil evidence demonstrates the existence of swifts during that period in Europe. At that time, most of Europe had a humid, subtropical climate, possibly comparable to modern-day southern China. For a map of Early–Middle Eocene Earth, see the Paleomap project; here note that both the Caucasus mountains and the Alps did not exist yet and aegialornithids were possibly present in North America.
By the late Eocene (around 35 MYA), primitive hummingbirds started to diverge from the related jungornithids; the Middle Eocene Parargornis (Messel, Germany) and the Late Eocene Argornis, found in today's southernmost Russia, belong to this lineage. Cypselavus (Late Eocene – Early Oligocene of Quercy, France) was either a primitive hemiprocnid or an aegialornithid.

The placement of the Aegialornithidae is not quite clear. Various analyses place them sufficiently close to the Apodiformes to be included here, or into the unique owlet-nightjar lineage in the Cypselomorphae.

Taxonomy

ORDER APODIFORMES
 Family †Aegialornithidae Lydekker, 1891 [Primapinae Harrison, 1984c]
 Genus †Primapus Harrison & Walker, 1975
 Genus †Aegialornis Lydekker, 1891
 Suborder Apodi
 Genus †Procypseloides Harrison, 1984c
 Genus †Laputavis Dyke, 2001b
 Genus †Scaniacypselus Harrison, 1984
 Family †Eocypselidae Harrison 1984
 Genus †Eocypselus Harrison, 1984
 Family Hemiprocnidae Oberholser, 1906 (treeswifts)
 Family Apodidae Olphe-Galliard, 1887 (swifts)
 Suborder Trochili
 Genus †Palescyvus Karchu, 1988
 Family †Cypselavidae Mourer-Chauviré, 2006
 Genus †Argornis Karchu, 1999
 Genus †Cypselavus Gaillard, 1908
 Genus †Parargornis Mayr, 2003
 Family †Jungornithidae Karchu, 1988
 Genus †Jungornis Karchu, 1988
 Family Trochilidae Vigors, 1825 (hummingbirds)

See also
 List of Apodiformes by population

References

 
Bird orders
Extant Paleocene first appearances
Paleocene taxonomic orders
Eocene taxonomic orders
Oligocene taxonomic orders
Miocene taxonomic orders
Pliocene taxonomic orders
Pleistocene taxonomic orders
Holocene taxonomic orders
Taxa named by James L. Peters